Microvelia pygmaea is a Palearctic species of  true bug. It is aquatic.

References
 

Gerrini
Hemiptera of Europe
Insects described in 1833